Jacobsen is a Danish and Norwegian patronymic surname meaning "son of Jacob". The prefix derives from the biblical given name Yaakov ("supplanter" or "follower"). The cognate Jakobsen is less common.  The English language patronymic surname Jacobson is a parallel form, of which the earliest records are found in Huntingdon in 1244. Scandinavian immigrants to English-speaking countries often changed the spelling to Jacobson in order to accommodate English orthographic rules. Notable people with the surname include:

Alice Jacobsen (1928–1993), American sculptor 
Allan Jacobsen (rugby union) (born 1978), Scottish rugby union player
Allan Jacobsen (cyclist) (born 1955), Danish cyclist
Allan Jacobsen (Australian footballer) (1916-1995), Australian rules footballer
Anders Jacobsen (footballer) (born 1968), Norwegian footballer
Anders Jacobsen (ski jumper) (born 1985), Norwegian ski jumper
Anker Jacobsen (1911–1975), Danish tennis player
Anna Jacobsen (1924–2004), Norwegian champion of Southern Sami language and culture
Annie Jacobsen, American investigative journalist and author
Arne Jacobsen (1902–1971), Danish architect and designer
Astrid Jacobsen (born 1987), Norwegian cross-country skier
Bernhard M. Jacobsen (1862-1936), Congressman from Iowa, USA
Bo Jacobsen (born 1948), Danish chess master
Carl Jacobsen (1842-1914), CEO Carlsberg brewery
Casey Jacobsen (born 1981), American basketball player
Christian Høgni Jacobsen (born 1980), Faroese football striker
Douglas Jacobsen, American religious scholar
 Edva Jacobsen, (born 1964), Faroese economist and politician
Eric Jacobsen (basketball) (born 1994), American basketball player
Eric Jacobsen (conductor) (born 1982), American conductor and cellist
Erik Jacobsen (born 1940), American record producer
 Fritz Jacobsen (1894-1981), World War I flying ace
Florence S. Jacobsen (1913-2017), sixth general president of the Young Women's Mutual Improvement Association of The Church of Jesus Christ of Latter-day Saints
Gay Jacobsen D'Asaro (born 1954), American foil fencer
Henry Jacobsen (1898-1964), Norwegian politician
J. C. Jacobsen (1811-1887), Danish industrialist who founded Carlsberg brewery
Jens Peter Jacobsen (1847–1885), Danish novelist, poet, and scientist
Johan Jacobsen (1912-1972), Danish film director
Jón Rói Jacobsen (born 1983), Faroese football defender
Jørgen-Frantz Jacobsen (1900-1938), Faroese writer
Joseph Jacobsen (born 1987), American pair skater
Josephine Jacobsen (1908-2003), American author
Ken Jacobsen (born 1945), American politician
Kevin Jacobsen (born 1937), Australian entertainment businessman
Kevin J. Jacobsen (born 1958), American brigadier general
Kirsten Jacobsen (1942–2010), Danish politician 
Lars Jacobsen (born 1979), Danish footballer
Mette Jacobsen (born 1973), Danish Olympic swimmer
Nicolas Jacobsen, American hacker
Nils Kristen Jacobsen (1908-1993), Norwegian politician
Pål Jacobsen (born 1956), Norwegian football coach, former player
Pætur Dam Jacobsen (born 1982), Faroese footballer
Peder Nikolai Leier Jacobsen (1888-1967), Norwegian politician
Peter Jacobsen (1950-2002), English jazz pianist
Peter Jacobsen (born 1954), American golfer
Rógvi Jacobsen (born 1979), Faroese football (soccer) striker
Rolf Jacobsen (boxer) (1899-1960), Norwegian boxer
Rolf Jacobsen (1907-1994), Norwegian author
Rolf Jacobsen (politician) (1865-1942), Norwegian jurist and politician
Roy Jacobsen (born 1954), Norwegian author
Rune Angell-Jacobsen (born 1947), Norwegian novelist 
Solveig Gunbjörg Jacobsen, first person born south of the Antarctic Convergence
Steinbjørn B. Jacobsen (1937–2012), Faroese poet, teacher and writer
Stephen Jacobsen, American bioengineer
Stephanie Jacobsen (born 1980), actress
Thomas Jacobsen (footballer) (born 1983), Norwegian footballer
Thomas Jacobsen (sailor) (born 1972), Danish sailor
Thomas Jacobsen (sledge hockey) (born 1987)
Thorkild Jacobsen (1904–1993), Danish-born historian and specialist in Assyriology and the Epic of Gilgamesh
Uwe Jacobsen (born 1940), German swimmer
 Will Jacobsen (born 1988), American basketball player
William S. Jacobsen (1887-1955), Congressman from Iowa, USA

See also
Jakobsen

References

Danish-language surnames
Norwegian-language surnames
Patronymic surnames
Surnames from given names